Paddy Kennedy (1926-2011) was a Gaelic footballer from County Sligo. He played for the Sligo county team in the 1950s, winning a Connacht Junior Football Championship in 1956. He played his club football with the Tourlestrane club and helped them to a first Sligo Senior Football Championship in 1956. His two sons Fintan and Richard followed in their father's footsteps by winning senior championship medals with Tourlestrane in the 1990s.

References

1926 births
2011 deaths
Sligo inter-county Gaelic footballers
Tourlestrane Gaelic footballers